Samipeni Finau (born 10 May 1999 in Tonga) is a New Zealand rugby union player who plays for the  in Super Rugby. His playing position is lock or flanker. He was named in the Chiefs squad for round 2 of the 2021 Super Rugby Aotearoa season. He was also a member of the  2020 Mitre 10 Cup squad.

Reference list

External links
itsrugby.co.uk profile

1999 births
New Zealand rugby union players
Living people
Rugby union locks
Rugby union flankers
Moana Pasifika players
Waikato rugby union players
Chiefs (rugby union) players